Andrew Mercer may refer to:

People:

Andrew Mercer (cricketer) (born 1979), English cricketer
Andrew Mercer (poet) (1775–1842), Scottish poet
Andrew Egyapa Mercer (born 1973), Ghanaian politician and lawyer
Andrew Mercer (mayor), New Zealand politician
Andrew Mercer (curler), Canadian curler

Institutions:
 Andrew Mercer Reformatory for Women, former prison and treatment facility for women in Toronto, Canada.